Marnaz is a commune in the Haute-Savoie department in the Auvergne-Rhône-Alpes region in south-eastern France. It is around 34 km south-east of Geneva.

Population

Twin towns — sister cities
Marnaz is twinned with Quincinetto, Italy since 1996.

See also
Communes of the Haute-Savoie department

References

Communes of Haute-Savoie